Sunset View Beach is an organized hamlet in the Canadian province of Saskatchewan within the RM of Mervin No. 499 and Census Division No. 17. Part of the RM of Parkdale No. 498 prior to September 1992, it subsequently held resort village status until it dissolved to become part of the RM of Mervin No. 499 in January 2015.

History 
Sunset View Beach originally incorporated as a resort village on September 1, 1992. Prior to incorporation it was part of the RM of Parkdale No. 498. Sunset View Beach subsequently dissolved on January 1, 2005, becoming an organized hamlet under the jurisdiction of the RM of Mervin No. 499.

Demographics 

Government 
While Sunset View Beach is under the jurisdiction of the RM of Mervin No. 499, it has a three-person hamlet board that is chaired by Ray Fenrich.

See also 
List of communities in Saskatchewan
List of municipalities in Saskatchewan
List of resort villages in Saskatchewan

References 

Designated places in Saskatchewan
Former resort villages in Saskatchewan
Organized hamlets in Saskatchewan
Populated places disestablished in 2005
Mervin No. 499, Saskatchewan
Division No. 17, Saskatchewan